Rossa A. Fanning (born 1976) is an Irish barrister and legal academic who has served as the Attorney General of Ireland since December 2022. His practice at the Bar has been primarily focused on commercial litigation and insolvency.

Early life 
Fanning was born in 1976 and is from Leopardstown, Dublin. He attended secondary school at Blackrock College. He studied for a BCL law degree from University College Dublin and obtained a master's degree from UCD where he wrote a thesis on civil procedure. While at UCD, he was returning officer for the University College Dublin Students' Union and was auditor of the University College Dublin Law Society. He studied for an LLM degree at the University of Michigan Law School as a scholar of the Fulbright Program. He attended the King's Inns and was the individual winner of the Irish Times Debate while studying there.

Legal career 
Fanning was called to the Bar in 1999 and devilled for David Barniville. After several years as a Junior Counsel, he was appointed Senior Counsel in 2016. He has worked across a broad spectrum of commercial cases including insolvency and restructuring, commercial leases, defamation, debt recovery, repossessions and professional negligence.

Notable cases 
He has represented various multinational technology companies including Facebook, Google, and Twitter in disputes.  

He acted for Rory McIlroy in a High Court dispute over agreements with his former management company and MCD Productions's barrister when it sought to enforce a judgment against Prince.

Fanning has acted in cases for various insolvency practitioners and creditors across notable cases including CityJet, USIT, Monsoon Accessorize, the Business Post, Debenhams, and Norwegian Air, and acted for the receivers of Apollo House. 

He was successful in obtaining a €8.2 million judgment against Bill Cullen for his client Danske Bank in 2012.

Fanning was barrister for Michael Fingleton in a debt recovery case taken by former employer Irish Nationwide Building Society. 

He was a member of the legal team for Seán Quinn and two of his sons in action taken by Anglo Irish Bank but resigned while the case was ongoing.

He was defence counsel for the Congregation of the Holy Spirit in a civil action for damages.

In 2022, he represented Dany Boon in the High Court in an action to recover money he claimed was fraudulently taken from him.

He has acted for the State in judicial review proceedings and for the Health Products Regulatory Authority in a test case in relation to the Pandemrix vaccine.

Fanning appeared at the Disclosures Tribunal (for Paul Williams and Independent News and Media) and the Moriarty Tribunal (for Michael Lowry).

Academic career 
Fanning was a lecturer in law at UCD, lecturing in company law and constitutional law, and has written on these topics for the Irish Jurist. The growth of his practice led to him leaving behind teaching. He took part in a panel discussion at the Constitutional Convention in 2014 on the topic of economic, social and cultural rights.

Attorney General 
Fanning was appointed Attorney General of Ireland on 17 December 2022, succeeding Paul Gallagher.

Personal life 
Fanning lives in Dublin city centre. He is a past chair of the selection committee for the Ireland Davis Cup team.

References

Living people
1976 births
21st-century Irish lawyers
Attorneys General of Ireland
Alumni of University College Dublin
University of Michigan Law School alumni
People educated at Blackrock College
Alumni of King's Inns
Irish Senior Counsel